Nordlys may refer to -

Nordlys, a Norwegian newspaper first published in 1902
Nordlys (album), an album by Norwegian band Midnattsol
, the name of two Hurtigruten cruise ships
it translates as “Northern Lights” in the Norwegian and Danish languages , and refers to the Aurora Borealis